Paul-Théodore Acker (14 September 1874 – 27 June 1915) was a French-language writer of popular novels.

Biography 

Paul Acker was born on 14 September 1874 in Saverne.

A journalist, he contributed to Le Gaulois, L'Écho de Paris, Revue des deux Mondes, L'Illustration, Revue de Paris, and Revue critique des idées et des livres.

On 27 June 1915, he was killed in a car accident while on military service near the Thann front. He was buried in Saverne on 11 August 1922. A memorial stele was erected in his memory by the Souvenir français in Goldbach.
Charles Maurras paid him posthumous tribute in his book Tombeaux and mentioned his membership in the Action française.

Selected works 
 Dispensé de l'Article 23 (preface by Willy, illustrated cover by Charles Léandre), 1898, H. Simonis-Empis
 Un mari sans femme, 1902, Librairie Molière
 Petites confessions. Visites et portraits, 1905
 La Petite Madame de Thianges, 1906, Calmann Lévy
 Le Désir de vivre, 1907, Calmann Lévy
 Œuvres sociales des femmes, 1908, Plon-Nourrit Read online
 Le Soldat Bernard, 1909, Fayard
 Les Exilés, 1911, Plon (several editions until 1920)
 Le Beau Jardin, 1910, Plon (several editions until 1919)
 Une ville industrielle alsacienne: Mulhouse, 1912
 Les deux cahiers, 1912, Plon-Nourrit Read online
 Les deux amours, 1914
 Les Demoiselles Bertram, 1914, Plon-Nourrit
 Trois tombes, 1916, Plon-Nourrit
 L'Oiseau vainqueur, 1916, Flammarion
 Entre deux rives, 1917, Plon
 Colmar : une ville alsacienne, 1919, Éd. de la Haute-Alsace
 Tante Babiole - Collection Stella 
 Les Deux Cahiers - Collection Stella 
 Les Exilés - Select-Collection 
 Les Exilés, preface by Jean-Noël Grandhomme, Éditions Laborintus, Lille-Paris, 2016,

Distinctions 
 Paul Acker was awarded the first Grand Prix du Roman de l'Académie française for his body of work in 1915.
 Paul Acker is listed among the writers who died for their country on the Panthéon's list of people cited.

Notes and references

See also 

 Pierre Bucher

Bibliography 
 Henry Bordeaux, Trois tombes. (La Prière pour les absents. Max Doumic. Paul Acker. Maurice Deroure. Les Honneurs aux morts.), Plon-Nourrit, Paris, 1916, XIII-291 p.
 Alphonse Wollbrett, "Paul Acker", in Nouveau dictionnaire de biographie alsacienne, vol. 1, p. 13.
 .

External links 

20th-century French writers
20th-century French journalists
1874 births
People from Saverne
People from Bas-Rhin
1915 deaths
Road incident deaths in France